Gogołowice may refer to the following places in Poland:
Gogołowice in Gmina Lubin, Lubin County in Lower Silesian Voivodeship (SW Poland)
Gogołowice in Gmina Milicz, Milicz County in Lower Silesian Voivodeship (SW Poland)